Robert Richard Relf (1 September 1883 – 28 April 1965) was an English first-class cricketer who was born in Berkshire. He played for Sussex and also represented PW Sherwell's XI. He was, for many years, cricket Coach at Leighton Park School in Reading. He was the younger brother of Albert Relf, who as well as playing for Sussex played 13 Tests for England.

References

External links

1883 births
1965 deaths
English cricketers
Sussex cricketers
Berkshire cricketers
Marylebone Cricket Club cricketers
North v South cricketers
Players cricketers
Minor Counties cricketers
English cricketers of 1919 to 1945
H. D. G. Leveson Gower's XI cricketers
Players of the South cricketers
A. E. R. Gilligan's XI cricketers
P. F. Warner's XI cricketers